The Dominica–France Maritime Delimitation Agreement is a 1987 treaty between Dominica and France which delimits the maritime boundary between Dominica and the French islands of Guadeloupe and Martinique. It was the first maritime boundary treaty in the Central America/Caribbean region to be based on the rules of the Convention on the Law of the Sea.

The treaty was signed in Paris on 7 September 1987. The text of the treaty sets out two boundaries. The first boundary separates Dominica from Guadeloupe to its north. It consists of seven straight-line maritime segments defined by eight individual coordinate points.

The more southern boundary separates Dominica from Martinique to its south. It consists of five straight-line segments defined by six individual coordinate points.

The treaty came into force on 23 December 1988 after it had been ratified by both states. The full name of the treaty is Agreement on Maritime Delimitation between the Government of French Republic and the Government of Dominica. The treaty was signed by French Prime Minister Jacques Chirac and Dominica Prime Minister Eugenia Charles.

See also 
 Dominica Passage
 Martinique Passage
 Barbados–France Maritime Delimitation Agreement

Notes

References
 Anderson, Ewan W. (2003). International Boundaries: A Geopolitical Atlas. Routledge: New York. ;  OCLC 54061586
 Charney, Jonathan I., David A. Colson, Robert W. Smith. (2005). International Maritime Boundaries, 5 vols. Hotei Publishing: Leiden.	; ; ; ; ;  OCLC 23254092

External links
Full text of agreement

Treaties concluded in 1987
Treaties entered into force in 1988
Dominica–France relations
1987 in Dominica
1987 in the Caribbean
1987 in France
Dominica–Guadeloupe border
Dominica–Martinique border
Treaties of Dominica
Boundary treaties
Treaties of France
United Nations treaties
Treaties extended to Martinique
Treaties extended to Guadeloupe